Sandhurst to Owlsmoor Bogs and Heaths is an  biological Site of Special Scientific Interest (SSSI) on the northern outskirts of Sandhurst in Berkshire. Part of the SSSI is  Wildmoor Heath nature reserve, which is managed by the Berkshire, Buckinghamshire and Oxfordshire Wildlife Trust. and the SSSI is part of Thames Basin Heaths Special Protection Area.

Geography

Wildmoor Heath is situated on a slope and features wet and dry lowland heath and valley bog, plus pine and broadleaved woodland.

History

In 1975 the site was designated a site of special scientific interest (SSSI). Wildmoor Heath nature reserve was formed in 1998 by combining land at Edgbarrow Woods, Owlsmoor Bog, and Wildmoor Bottom.

Fauna

The site has the following animals:

Mammals

Red fox
Roe deer
Dexter cattle

Reptiles and amphibians

Vipera berus
Grass snake
Anguis fragilis
Viviparous lizard

Birds
Common chiffchaff
Great spotted woodpecker
European green woodpecker
European nightjar
Common snipe
European stonechat
Willow warbler
Dartford warbler
Woodlark
Eurasian bullfinch
Eurasian hobby
Common kingfisher

Invertebrates

Flora

The site has the following flora:

Trees
Birch
Pine
Fraxinus
Maple
Quercus robur
Malus sylvestris
Sorbus torminalis

Plants
Erica tetralix
Molinia caerulea
Drosera rotundifolia
Drosera intermedia
Rhynchospora alba
Carex pulicaris
Narthecium ossifragum
Pinguicula vulgaris
Calluna
Eriophorum angustifolium
Succisa pratensis
Scutellaria minor
Hypericum elodes
Lychnis flos-cuculi
Succisa pratensis

References

Sites of Special Scientific Interest in Berkshire